Storm Reid (born July 1, 2003) is an American actress. After playing a small role in the television film A Cross to Bear (2012), Reid made her acting debut with an appearance in the period drama film 12 Years a Slave (2013). She earned recognition for a starring role in the superhero film Sleight (2016), and subsequently had her breakthrough with the fantasy film A Wrinkle in Time (2018), for which she received nominations for the Teen Choice Award for Choice Fantasy Movie Actress and the NAACP Image Award for Outstanding Breakthrough Role in a Motion Picture.

Reid has appeared in the thriller film Don't Let Go (2019), the critically-acclaimed Netflix miniseries When They See Us (2019) and horror film The Invisible Man (2020). She currently stars in the HBO drama series Euphoria (2019–present) and played a minor role in the superhero film The Suicide Squad (2021). In 2020, Reid received a nomination for the BET YoungStars Award. She has since starred in the mystery thriller Missing (2023) and played Riley Abel in HBO's The Last of Us, a television adaption of the 2013 video game of the same name.

Early life
Reid was born on July 1, 2003 in Atlanta, Georgia, to Rodney and Robyn Simpson Reid. Both of her parents are American. She is the youngest of her siblings: elder brother Josh and two sisters, Iman and Paris. From an early age, Reid aspired to become an actress, and at the age of 9, she and her family moved to Los Angeles for her to pursue acting.

Career
Reid began her professional acting career at a young age, debuting with the television film A Cross To Bear in 2012. In 2013, she starred as Emily in the historical drama film 12 Years a Slave, which received critical acclaim. In 2016, she starred as Tina in the science fiction drama film Sleight, the younger sister of the film's protagonist, Bo. The film was a success, and was received positively. Also in 2016, she starred as Aki in the film Lea to the Rescue, which was part of the American Girl film series. 

In 2017, she appeared as Patricia in the comedy-drama film A Happening of Monumental Proportions, which had been received negatively by critics. Better received was her role as Meg Murry in Ava DuVernay's A Wrinkle in Time, which was based on the novel of the same name. In spite of the film emerging as a box-office bomb, Reid's performance earned acclaim from critics, with some noting her take on the character as a highlight of the film. Writing for The Hollywood Reporter, Josh Spiegel stated that "Reid is one of the film's biggest assets overall; Meg's arc from being crippled by self-doubt to embracing her faults and her dysfunctional family is wonderfully realized through her expressive and subtle work." For the role, she earned a nomination for the Teen Choice Award for Choice Fantasy Movie Actress and the NAACP Image Award for Outstanding Breakthrough Role in a Motion Picture.

In 2019, Reid starred as Lisa in two episodes of the critically acclaimed Netflix limited series When They See Us. and began portraying the main role of Gia Bennett, the younger sister of the series' protagonist Rue, in the HBO teen drama series Euphoria. That same year, she voiced Nia in the Hulu series The Bravest Knight, and co-starred with David Oyelowo in the drama film Don't Let Go as Ashley, the latter of which earned her and Oyelowo positive reviews. FilmSnobReviews wrote that the pair "bring an emotion-filled performance to the screen, capturing grief and confusion to near perfection."

In 2020, Reid starred as Sydney Lanier, the daughter of James Lanier, in the science fiction horror film The Invisible Man, which was a commercial success and received critical acclaim. In the same year, she was nominated for the BET YoungStars Award. Reid joined the cast of the superhero film The Suicide Squad in 2019, and it was released in 2021. The following year, she starred opposite Colson Baker, Kevin Bacon and Travis Fimmel in the ensemble action feature One Way. Reid also had leading roles in the mystery/thriller film Missing—which was filmed over the COVID-19 pandemic—and the supernatural horror film The Nun 2. In 2023, she portrayed Riley Abel in the HBO series The Last of Us.

Personal life 
In February 2017, Reid was in a relationship with actor Sayeed Shahidi. In the fall of 2021, she began attending the University of Southern California. She is currently dating Shedeur Sanders, son of football star Deion Sanders.

Filmography

Film

Television

Music videos

Awards and nominations

References

External links

 
 

2003 births
Living people
Actresses from Atlanta
African-American actresses
21st-century American actresses
African-American child actresses
American film actresses
American television actresses
American voice actresses
21st-century African-American women